Enlow is a census-designated place (CDP) in Allegheny County, Pennsylvania, United States.  The community was formerly part of the Imperial-Enlow CDP, which was split into two separate CDPs as of the 2010 census.  The population was 1,138 at the 2020 census.

The CDP is located in North Fayette and Findlay townships.

History
Enlow Station was a stop on the Montour Railroad at the current location of Enlow. The station was named for Amos Enlow, a farmer in the area.

Geography
Enlow is located at  (40.4520, -80.2323).

Demographics

References

Census-designated places in Allegheny County, Pennsylvania
Pittsburgh metropolitan area
Census-designated places in Pennsylvania